Holywood Yacht Club is located in Holywood, County Down, Northern Ireland on the south shore of Belfast Lough

It was established in 1862. The clubhouse has been renovated several times, most recently in 1998.

The club is one of the clubs on the lough that form part of the Belfast Lough Yachting Conference

On Tuesday evenings the club hosts an acoustic guitar session.`

External links
 Holywood Yacht Club

Yacht clubs in Northern Ireland
Sports clubs in County Down
1862 establishments in Ireland